John Alexander Corrie (born 29 July 1935) is a Scottish Conservative and Unionist Party politician and chief of Clan Corrie. He describes himself in Who's Who as a "consultant on African affairs and financial adviser to developing countries".

Early life
Corrie was educated at Kirkcudbright Academy, George Watson's College, Edinburgh and Lincoln Agricultural College, New Zealand. He is a farmer, and was the Nuffield Scholar in agriculture 1972/1973.

Political career
Corrie was Chairman of the Young Unionists from 1963–64.

Corrie contested North Lanarkshire in 1964 and Central Ayrshire in 1966. He was Member of Parliament for Bute and Northern Ayrshire from February 1974 to 1983, and for Cunninghame North from 1983 until the 1987 general election, when he lost his seat to the Labour Party candidate Brian Wilson. Although he stood in 1992 for Argyll and Bute, he was defeated and did not return to the Commons.

Corrie was also a Member of the European Parliament (MEP) for three periods. He was an MEP twice in the period when it was indirectly elected, from 1975 to 1976 and from 1977 to 1979. He was later elected the MEP for Worcestershire and South Warwickshire and from 1994 to 1999, and then for the multi-seat West Midlands constituency from the 1999 election until the 2004 election. He was Co-President of the African, Caribbean, and Pacific Joint Parliamentary Assembly from 1999 to 2002, and is now Honorary Life President. Mr. Corrie now also sits as member of the AWEPA Governing Council.

References

External links

1935 births
Living people
Members of the Parliament of the United Kingdom for Scottish constituencies
People educated at George Watson's College
UK MPs 1974
UK MPs 1974–1979
UK MPs 1979–1983
UK MPs 1983–1987
Conservative Party (UK) MEPs
MEPs for the United Kingdom 1973–1979
MEPs for England 1994–1999
MEPs for England 1999–2004
Lincoln University (New Zealand) alumni
Scottish Conservative Party MPs
Scottish farmers
Scottish agronomists
Unionist Party (Scotland) politicians
British consultants
Financial advisors
People associated with North Ayrshire